Deptropine (Brontina) also known as dibenzheptropine, is an antihistamine with anticholinergic properties acting at the H1 receptor. It is usually marketed as the citrate salt.

References 

H1 receptor antagonists
Tropanes
Dibenzocycloheptenes
Ethers